Mark Ford (born October 12, 1970, in Ronceverte, West Virginia) is a trainer of Standardbred horses in the sport of harness racing. He is best known as the trainer of Gallo Blue Chip, 2000 Harness Horse of the Year and the then richest pacer of all time. That year, Mark Ford was voted the Dan Patch Trainer of the Year Award along with co-winner Jimmy Takter. Mark Ford also trained Shadow Play in his major United States races for his Canadian trainer and co-owner Dr. Ian Moore. Ford won the 2008 Adios Pace at Pocono Downs. 

In 2016, Mark Ford was elected President of the Standardbred Owners Association of New Jersey (SBOANJ).

References

1970 births
Living people
American horse trainers
Dan Patch Award winners
Harness racing in the United States
People from Ronceverte, West Virginia